Frasin is a town in Suceava County, mountainous northeastern Romania. It is situated in the historical region of Bukovina. Frasin is the thirteenth-largest urban settlement in the county, with a population of 5,702 according to the 2011 census. It was declared a town in 2004, along with seven other localities in Suceava County. The town administers the former village of Bucșoaia (which became a neighborhood in 2004), Doroteia, and Plutonița (with the status of associated villages).

Administration and local politics

Town council 

The town's current local council has the following political composition, according to the results of the 2020 Romanian local elections:

Geography 

Frasin is surrounded by the Bukovina Ridges of the Obcinele Mari, on the banks of Moldova River, between Câmpulung Moldovenesc and Gura Humorului, on European route E58. The town of Gura Humorului is only 7 km away. Frasin is connected to the Romanian national railway system and has a railway station on the Suceava–Vatra Dornei railway.

History 

In 1785, Frasin was known as a hamlet. One big step towards good development for Frasin took place in 1816 when a potassium factory was built. Frasin was declared a town in 1850.

Until 1918, Frasin was part of the Austrian monarchy (the province of Bukovina remained an Austrian crown land after the compromise of 1867), in the Câmpulung district, one of the 9 Bezirkshauptmannschaften of the province.

Tourism 

Frasin is located in the historical region of Bukovina where visitors can admire a whole number of painted medieval churches with World Heritage status. One of the most popular is Voroneț Monastery, built in 1488. Another asset of the area are the nature reserves like the primeval forest of Slătioara ("Codrul secular Slătioara") and the forests of the Giumalău Mountains.

Natives 

 Radu Mareș

Notes

External links 

  Frasin Town Hall official site
  Frasin School 
  Suceava County site – Frasin web page

Towns in Romania
Populated places in Suceava County
Localities in Southern Bukovina